is a fictional character in Square Enix's Final Fantasy series and the main protagonist of the 2001 role-playing video game Final Fantasy X. Tidus is a 17-year-old from the city of Zanarkand who is transported to the world of Spira following an attack by the creature Sin. Shortly after his arrival he meets and joins Yuna, a mage and her guardians in a pilgrimage to kill Sin after learning that he is actually his missing father Jecht. He has appeared in other video games, including the Final Fantasy X sequel X-2, the Kingdom Hearts series, and several Square Enix crossover games.

Tidus was designed by Tetsuya Nomura with a cheerful appearance, in contrast to previous Final Fantasy protagonists. Scenario writer Kazushige Nojima wanted to expand the relationship between player and character with monologues describing the game's setting. While the narrative was initially focused the romance between Tidus and Yuna, Square provided a major focus on his misrelationship with Jecht in order to provide a major impact in the setting. Tidus is voiced primarily by Masakazu Morita in Japanese and James Arnold Taylor in English. Both actors enjoyed voicing the character, and Morita also performed his motion capture.

He has been generally well received by video-game critics. Tidus' cheerful personality and heroic traits make him an appealing protagonist, contrasting with previous male characters in the franchise. His character development and romantic relationship with Yuna are considered among the best in video games, although reviewers and fans were divided on Taylor's voicing. Tidus has been popular with fans, often ranking as one of the best Final Fantasy characters in polls. Action figures and Tidus-related jewelry have been produced, and he is a popular cosplay character.

Creation and development 
Before the development of Final Fantasy X, game scenario writer Kazushige Nojima was concerned about the relationship between the player and the main character in a Final Fantasy title and wanted to try to make the story easier to follow. Since the player and the main character find themselves in a new world, Nojima wanted Tidus' understanding of that world to track the player's progress in the game. Nojima felt that Tidus was the easiest character to draw in the first half of Final Fantasy X, because character and player learn about the storyline together. Nojima created a brief description of Tidus for character designer Tetsuya Nomura, and Nomura created a sketch for input from Nojima and other staff members. Nomura was asked to design Tidus differently from the game's theme so he would stand out. Movie director Hiroshi Kuwabara noted the difficulty the developers had in making Tidus and the other main characters realistic. The staff wanted to use an undead person as a playable character, and Tidus was meant to be that character. During the game's development, however, Nojima saw a film with a similar idea for its protagonist. The role of an undead person was then given to a secondary character, Auron. Director Yoshinori Kitase said that in the development of Final Fantasy X, one of the staff's main objectives was to focus on the romance between Tidus and Yuna. Nojima said that he cried during the game's ending, when Tidus and Yuna are separated and Tidus vanishes.

Nomura mentioned the contrast between the lead male and female protagonists established by their names; Tidus' name is based on the Okinawan word for "sun", and Yuna's name means "night" in Okinawan. The contrast is also indicated by the items required to empower their celestial weapons: the sun sigil and crest for Tidus, and the moon sigil and crest for Yuna. Because a player can change Tidus' name, the character is not referred to by name in audible dialogue, but a character in Dream Zanarkand uses Tidus' name in a dialogue box. The only other in-game appearance of his name is "Tidu" in Spiran script on the nameplate of an Auroch locker in the Luca stadium. Before Final Fantasy Xs release, Tidus was known to the media as Tida. In early 2001, PlayOnline changed the character's name to "Tidus". Because his name is never spoken in FFX, its intended pronunciation has been debated. Interviews with James Arnold Taylor and spoken dialogue in the English versions of Dissidia Final Fantasy, Dissidia 012 Final Fantasy, and Kingdom Hearts (with cameo appearances by the character) indicate that it is pronounced ; in the English version of Kingdom Hearts II, Tidus' name is pronounced . According to Taylor, it was pronounced  during the localization of FFX because the narrator of an early English trailer pronounced it that way.

For the sequel, Final Fantasy X-2, producer Kitase thought that the greatest fan expectation was for the reunion of Tidus and Yuna after their separation in the first game. The game generated rumors about Tidus' connection with the villain, Shuyin, who was physically similar and had the same actors. Square responded that such a storyline, given Tidus' nature, would be too complicated. For the remastering of Final Fantasy X and X-2, producer Kitase's motivation was to have people too young to have played the games experience them; his son was only old enough to know the characters of Tidus and Yuna from Dissidia Final Fantasy and its prequel.

Design
Designer Nomura said that he wanted Tidus' clothing and accessories to suggest a relationship with the sea. Tidus' clothing has a distinctive blue motif; his blitzball team logo, based on a fish hook, is an amalgam of the letters "J" and "T" (the first letters of Tidus' name and that of his father, Jecht). 

Tidus' design was specifically made to stand out within the world of Spira. Because of the improvements with the technology when compared with previous Final Fantasy games, Nomura also wanted to make Tidus' face more realistic and make his built more noticeable especially when compared with previous Final Fantasy characters who had a scrawney look. Square specifically asked for Tidus to have an Asian vibe. Both Tidus and fellow comrade share the keycolor blue with the former making match with the ocean. Artist Yusuke Naora also worked on Tidus' design and his relation to the sea, which he found hard to draw and transform into CGI.

The developers had difficulty with Tidus and Yuna's kissing scene, since they were unaccustomed to animating romantic scenes. According to Visual Works director Kazuyuki Ikumori, this was due to the use of 3D models, and it was revised several times due to a negative response from female staff members. Tidus was initially a rude plumber who was part of a delinquent gang, but Kitase said he would be a weak protagonist and he was made an athlete instead.

Personality 
According to Nomura, he wanted to give Tidus a cheerful persona and appearance after designing serious, moody main characters for Final Fantasy VII and VIII. He wanted to continue the recent trend of sky-related names, and Kazushige Nojima chose a name based on tiida (Okinawan for "sun"). Nojima called Tidus' personality "lively" and compared him to Final Fantasy VIIIs Laguna Loire and Zell Dincht, two other cheerful characters. 

His relationship with his father was based on "stories throughout the ages, such as the ancient Greek legends" and would reveal the key to the weakness of Sin, the game's main antagonist. Kitase noted that, in contrast to previous orphan characters seen in the franchise, Tidus' character arc included accepting Jecht's seeking redemption for Tidus' child abuse. Kitase felt that the voice acting and facial expression were crucial to Tidus at this stage. Motomu Toriyama said that when Final Fantasy X was released, he saw the story from Tidus' point of view: "about parent, child and family". Although FFX was originally centered on the relationship between Tidus and Yuna, the addition of Jecht's character and his feud with son was added later in the making of the game to provide more focus on how the father and son produce a bigger impact in Spira's history rather than the romantic couple. Kitase found the story between Tidus and Jecht to be more moving than the story between Tidus and Yuna.

Voice actors
Masakazu Morita voiced Tidus in Japanese. He called the character a career highlight, comparable to his voicing of Bleach manga protagonist Ichigo Kurosaki. Morita also enjoyed performing Tidus' motion capture, which gave him a greater understanding of the character's personality; when he recorded Tidus' dialogue for the game, he moved his body. Morita said that Tidus was his favorite, calling him "the most outstanding, most special character to me". As his first work as an actor, he has fond memories of voicing Tidus and interacting with other Final Fantasy X staff members. Morita said that there was no difficulty in working as Tidus, since the character's personality was similar to his own, and he did not need to study the character. However, he was concerned that if fans did not enjoy Tidus it would impact his career. When announcing the Japanese actor, Square said that Morita was chosen because he also did the motion capture for Zell (which would make fans remember previous games). Across FFX there are also flashback scenes which depict a seven-year old Tidus. For these scenes Tidus is instead voiced by Yūto Nakamura.

For the fighting game Dissidia Final Fantasy, Morita returned to voice Tidus. He was concerned about being able to perform the character's lines like the original Final Fantasy series, since it had been nearly a decade since he voiced Tidus. By that time, he was also more accustomed to acting as Ichigo and Keiji Maeda from Capcom's Sengoku Basara hack-and-slash games and the characters had a different vocal tone than Tidus'. When Moriata returned to voice Tidus, he tried to make it match his original performance. When the game director complimented Morita for keeping the character's tone, Morita was relieved and joked that he felt younger.

James Arnold Taylor was Tidus' English-language voice. Taylor was offered the role by voice director Jack Fletcher (who believed that he would fit the character), and translator Alexander O. Smith explained Tidus to him. In contrast to Morita, Taylor made the character friendlier and less serious with the staff's approval. After recording Final Fantasy X, Taylor said that he would enjoy voicing Tidus again; the character was "like an old friend to me now. I know so much more about him now than I did when we first started, knowing hardly anything about him. I would really hate it if anybody else voiced him". Recording the game took Taylor three-and-a-half months, and he enjoyed the experience.

According to Taylor, it would be unrealistic for Tidus to hide emotion. He said that although there were things he would change about his performance (such as the scene where Tidus and Yuna begin laughing together), he was grateful for the warm fan reception of his work. Smith felt that the forced-laugh scene was adapted well from the original Japanese scene, because of how "stilted and out of place" it was in the original version. Smith was confused by Morita and Mayuko Aoki's performance, but after discussing it with Nojima he found it well done in both languages and called it "awkward" and "funny". When Final Fantasy X was re-released in 2013, Taylor said that he was proud to be Tidus' voice. For Dissidia NT, Taylor commented that while Tidus' new role would seem new to players due to how he is led once again into battle, people would still find him as an appealing new trait.

Appearances

Final Fantasy X series 
In Final Fantasy X, Tidus is a player in the underwater sport of blitzball in an advanced, technological version of Zanarkand. Belying his cheerful, carefree attitude, Tidus hates his absent father, Jecht—initially because of his mother's neglect, and later for their rivalry at blitzball. During a blitzball tournament, Zanarkand is destroyed by a huge, shrouded creature known as Sin. Sin transports Tidus and Jecht's friend, Auron, to the world of Spira. After his arrival on Spira, Tidus drifts to the island of Besaid and joins a number of guardians on a journey to help Yuna defeat Sin. Tidus joins them in the hope of finding his way home.

When he meets Auron, Tidus learns that Jecht and Auron made the same pilgrimage ten years before to protect the summoner Braska (Yuna's father) and defeated Sin (who was reborn as Jecht). As the journey continues, Tidus, losing hope that he will return home, begins a romantic relationship with Yuna and swears not to let her die after the guardians tell him that Sin's battle will kill her. When the party approaches Zanarkand, Tidus learns that he and Zanarkand are the dreams of dead people known as fayth. "Dream" Zanarkand was created when Sin was born during the war between Zanarkand and Bevelle and the original Zanarkand was destroyed. If Sin is permanently defeated, the summoning of Dream Zanarkand and its people (including Tidus) will cease. In the real Zanarkand, the group decides to find a way to destroy Sin which does not require the sacrifice of a guardian or a summoner. They attack Sin, entering its shell. They eventually find Jecht (whom they must defeat to eliminate Sin), and Tidus makes peace with his father in the aftermath. After defeating the spirit of Yu Yevon (who is responsible for Sin's rebirth), the fayth are allowed to leave and the summoning of Dream Zanarkand ends. As he vanishes, Tidus says goodbye to his friends and joins the spirits of Auron, Jecht and Braska in the afterlife.

Tidus makes few appearances in the plot of the 2003 sequel, Final Fantasy X-2, although meeting him is the player's objective. Two years after the events of FFX, Yuna sees a sphere with a young man resembling Tidus trapped in a prison. She joins the Gullwings, a sphere-hunting group, and travels around Spira in the hope of finding more clues that Tidus is alive. The individual in the sphere is later revealed as Shuyin. Depending on the player's development during the game, the fayth will appear to Yuna at the end and tell her that they can make Tidus return to her. He then appears in Spira, and he and Yuna are reunited. In another final scene, Tidus unsure whether or not he is still a dream wants to remain with Yuna. He is also an unlockable character as Star Player, a blitzball player. In Final Fantasy X-2: International + Last Mission (the game's updated version), Tidus is a recruitable playable character for battles. An extra episode, set after the original game's play-through, reveals that he is living in Besaid with Yuna. An illusion of Tidus also appears as a boss character.

Tidus' dialogue, monologues and songs were included on the Final Fantasy X Vocal Collection and feel/Go dream: Yuna & Tidus CDs. Although he does not fully understand that he is not the fayth dream, Tidus feels that disappearing would be preferable to making Yuna cry again. The novel Final Fantasy X-2.5 ~Eien no Daishou~, set after Final Fantasy X-2, explores Tidus and Yuna's visit to Besaid Island 1,000 years before. The HD remastered version of Final Fantasy X and X-2, Final Fantasy X/X-2 HD Remaster, adds an audio drama (Final Fantasy X: Will) in which Tidus is a new blitzball star who appears to be concealing an injury. After Yuna breaks up with him, Tidus helps her on a quest to defeat a reborn Sin. Tetsuya Nomura made a revision of Tidus's design for this game, hinting it at a possible Final Fantasy X-3. Onoe Kikunosuke portrays Tidus in the 2023 kabuki play adaptation of Final Fantasy X, including his child persona.

Other appearances 
He also appears in games outside the Final Fantasy X, and a younger version is a friend of the protagonists Sora and Riku in the Kingdom Hearts series. In Kingdom Hearts, Tidus appears with younger versions of Wakka and Final Fantasy VIIIs Selphie as an optional sparring opponent. The character makes a cameo appearance in Kingdom Hearts: Chain of Memories, and is mentioned briefly in Kingdom Hearts II. A digital replica of Tidus is a boss character in Kingdom Hearts Coded, and he appears with Auron and Yuna in the board game-based Itadaki Street Special.

In Dissidia Final Fantasy (an action game with several Final Fantasy heroes and villains), Tidus is the hero from Final Fantasy X: a warrior from the goddess, Cosmos, whose father works for the rival god Chaos. Tidus has two uniforms in this game, and his thoughts and actions refer to FFX. With the cast, he reappears in the prequel Dissidia 012 and represents Chaos in the previous war. Tidus is confronted by Yuna and offers his life to save her from an attack by the villain Emperor, but is saved by Jecht to become a warrior of Cosmos. In addition to his previous outfits, Tidus has a design based on an illustration by Square artist Yoshitaka Amano. He appears in the third entry in the series, Dissidia NT.

Tidus is a playable character in the Theatrhythm Final Fantasy rhythm game. He also appears in World of Final Fantasy, and Fortune Street: Dragon Quest & Final Fantasy 30th Anniversary. Tidus' disappearance between Final Fantasy X and its sequel is also explained in the game Mobius Final Fantasy. Trapped in an underworld-like place known as Palamecia, Tidus joins forces with a warrior known as Wol. The two join on a quest to become fully Warrior of Light though Tidus uses as a distraction since he does not care about his own well-being, satisfied with his actions in Spira. After seeing one of Yuna's creatures disappear from Palamecia, Tidus decides to search for a way to return to Spira. Following more battles, Tidus finds a crystal which allows him to be teleported back to the world. His latest appearance is in the mobile phone game Final Fantasy Explorers-Force.

Reception

Critical

Tidus had a positive reception in video-game publications. Raymon Padilla of GameSpy called him a "garishly dressed Leonardo DiCaprio", whose flaws make him appealing. Several critics often praised Tidus for his cheerful personality contrasting previous brooding leads. According to GameSpot reviewer Greg Kasavin, players might not initially like the character but would eventually find him "suitably endearing". Kasavin wrote that Tidus had the "surprising depth" characteristic of past Final Fantasy protagonists. Atlus character designer Kazuma Kaneko called him "a dashing lead character". 

Tidus' revelation of his true nature as a being created by the Fayth and apparent death confused critics though gave a sad impression.
 His gradual care for his abusive father was appreciated.  1UP found him the worst-dressed video-game character, while Logo TV noted Tidus' sex appeal as a reason for his popularity.

In the English-language version, IGN said that the character "has a tendency to speak a little too high and fast when he gets excited". This led to several negative responses. On the other hand, PSXextreme liked Taylor's work in voicing Tidus. In one scene, Yuna tells Tidus to laugh (to cheer him up) and Tidus forces a laugh. Although fans criticised the laughter as too forced, Taylor stated that it was an intentionally "awkward, goofy, dumb laugh".

The relationship between Tidus and Yuna was listed as one of the video-game "great loves" by GameSpot, and is often cited as one of the best romances in gaming too. Gamasutra's Leigh Alexander, calling Tidus a "forgettable hero", nevertheless praised his and Yuna's relationship. In 2001, Tidus and Yuna won Game Informer Best Couple of the Year award. Their kiss also gathered attention. Yuna's English voice actress, Hedy Burress, said that Tidus' interaction with Yuna gave her a humanized, "womanly aspect". The 1UP.com staff described Tidus as the "good kind of jock" because of his support for the game's other protagonists, but his anger and growth kept him from being a "stereotypical boy scout". According to Eurogamer's Tom Brawell, Tidus and the other characters "make much more dignified and believable decisions than those made by their predecessors in other Final Fantasy games".

Analysis
In the book, Dungeons, Dragons, and Digital Denizens: The Digital Role-Playing Game, authors Gerald A. Voorhees and Joshua Call compared Tidus with Final Fantasy VII protagonist Cloud Strife in appearance and weapon, but they found Tidus more realistic than Cloud. In Console Video Games and Global Corporations, Mia Consalvo stated that although Tidus was designed from a Western's perspective which contrasted the others' Eastern designs, the game managed to blend their looks and appeal to the audience. In the book Gaming Lives in the Twenty-First Century, the writers recalled that Tidus' characterization differs in the original Japanese release of Final Fantasy X and its English dub; the localized version failed to emulate the original Tidus. In Science Fiction Video Games Neal Roger Tringham describes Final Fantasy X as a game that focuses on melancholy by having Tidus disappear due to him taking down Sin with his town being also taken in the process. While the game often deals with the concept of dead spirits, Joseph Roach notes Tidus' nature of being a "Fayth" does not involve death but instead a memory-like being who stands out among the Fayths for how mature is his portrayal in the narrative. However, while Tidus becomes more heroic in the game to the point he manages to defeat Yu Yevon and end the cycle of death from Spira, he is still haunted by death in the process as a result of the Fayths not being able to mantain his physical form. Through his journeys and relationship with Yuna, Roach notes that Tidus manages to become his own individual especially in Final Fantasy X-2 due to him regaining his body.

Popularity

Tidus' character has also appeared in popularity polls and features in video-game publications. He was Final Fantasy X second-most-popular character behind Auron in a fan poll in 2001, while he remained at the top twenty years later. Complex listed him as the second-best Final Fantasy character, surpassed only by Cloud. His caring, cheerful personality (contrasting with previous Final Fantasy protagonists) was praised. GameZone ranked Tidus the third-best Final Fantasy character (behind Cloud and Sephiroth, also from Final Fantasy VII), and Heath Hooker called him "a complete mixture of everything cheesy and everything emotional". Tidus was the fourth-most-popular male Final Fantasy character in a 2012 Square Enix poll. In a Famitsu poll, Tidus was voted the 20th-best video-game character in Japan. Christian Nutt of GamesRadar wrote that despite initial issues, Tidus' character development during the game made him more likable; Nutt ranked him the fourth-best Final Fantasy hero. Tidus and Yuna were included in The Inquirers list of most memorable video-game couples, with Tidus' self-sacrifice and their farewell noted. To commemorate the franchise's 20th anniversary, Square released figurines of Tidus and other Final Fantasy protagonists. In 2020, Tidus was also voted as the seventh best character in the entire Final Fantasy franchise in a Japanese poll by NHK.

According to Square Enix producer Shinji Hashimoto, Tidus cosplay has been popular. The character has also inspired action figures and jewelry. For the first two X games' re-release, Nomura redesigned Tidus based on his older appearance from the audio drama Will. For the franchise's 30th anniversary, Square presented Tidus' new design in a museum. Director Takeo Kujiraoka from Dissidia NT noted that the staff received multiple requests by fans to include Tidus' Will look as an alternative design but Nomura said it was not possible as the company would first need to develop Final Fantasy X-3. For Final Fantasy X 20th anniversary, several fans also said they wanted a Final Fantasy X-3 to give Tidus and Yuna a proper happy ending.

See also 
 Characters of Final Fantasy X and X-2

References 

Characters designed by Tetsuya Nomura
Fictional aquatics sportspeople
Fictional bodyguards in video games
Fictional male sportspeople
Fictional patricides
Fictional swordfighters in video games
Final Fantasy characters
Final Fantasy X
Male characters in video games
Science fantasy video game characters
Teenage characters in video games
Video game characters introduced in 2001
Square Enix protagonists